WG 21 or Working group 21 may refer to:

ISO/IEC JTC 1/SC 7/WG 21
ISO/IEC JTC 1/SC 22/WG 21